George Smith was an Australian professional soccer player who played as a forward. He captained the Australia national soccer team in 1933. Often considered the best centre-forward in Australian soccer in the 1930s, he had an average of 2.66 goals per game for Australia and has had many goalscoring records throughout his 17-year career.

Club career
Smith played for a number of clubs in the Sydney and Wollongong areas including Corrimal, where he was the NSW top goalscorer for the 1932 season with 44 goals and St George up to 1936 where he scored 25 goals in 1933 and 51 goals in 1935. He then played for Granville and Leichhardt-Annandale. Throughout his career, Smith scored a total of 651 goals.

Granville-Clyde
Before the start of the 1936 NSW football, Smith signed for Granville-Clyde.

Metters
On 17 March 1938, Smith joined Metters. In May 1939, Smith refused to play with Metters after the team was relegated to the reserve grade, he said that if he was not good enough to play in the first-grade he would rather watch the games. He was dropped from Metters to seek a new club to join. He received offers from two clubs Leichhardt-Annandale and Woonona-Bulli to seek his transfer.

International career
Smith began his international career with Australia as captain in an international friendly, debuting in a 4–2 win over New Zealand scoring two goals. He became the first player to score a hat-trick for Australia in a 6–4 win against New Zealand. He scored seven goals in the three-match test series all against New Zealand in 1933. Smith was part of New South Wales' team, where he started and scored against his captained international team Australia. He returned to Australia's team with the captaincy given to Alec Cameron. He continued his outstanding goalscoring record by scoring four goals when Australia won 7–1 in July 1936 at Logan Park, Dunedin. A week later, Smith made another record by scoring five goals as he broke the record for most goals in an international match for Australia. For the first time in his national career, Smith failed to score when Australia won 4–1 over New Zealand. A year later, Smith retired from international football. Smith held the record as top goalscorer for Australia for 37 years, until the record was overtaken by Attila Abonyi in March 1973. On 3 May 1937, Smith announced his retirement from international football.

Career statistics

International

Scores and results list Australia's goal tally first, score column indicates score after each Australia goal.

Personal life 
George Smith married Miss Dorris Ruddock.

References

External links
 Australian Players Database at Ozfootball.

Australian soccer players
Australia international soccer players
Association football forwards